Refmex GL Glass is a Mexican manufacturer of high-quality industrial glass products. Its main markets are borosilicate glass, f-silicate glass, and industrial quartz glass.

The company was founded in 1977 at Zapopan, Mexico as Refractarios Mexicanos SA de CV .  The company later changed its name to  Refmex GL SA de CV. It was founded related to the crisis Mexico suffered in 1976 to help the nation out of it creating employment for local people in re-selling glass, later, in 1985, they started producing their own glass for windows, the business was not very successful and they began the borosilicate glass business in Mexico.

The company employs 125 employees worldwide, according to its 2011 reports.

The company currently has four plants, two of them in Tesistan, Mexico, and two located in Zapopan, a nearby territory. The company announced plans for a fifth plant in 2013, but it has not been approved yet.

External links
 Official company website

Companies based in Guadalajara, Jalisco
Manufacturing companies established in 1977
Glassmaking companies
Manufacturing companies of Mexico
Mexican brands
Mexican companies established in 1977